Ohio Christian University (OCU) is a private Christian college in Circleville, Ohio. It is denominationally affiliated with the Churches of Christ in Christian Union.

History
The school was founded in 1948 as Mount of Praise Bible College, which met at the Mount of Praise Campground, where the Churches of Christ in Christian Union held annual revivalist camp meetings. The primary objective of the bible college was to train ministers for the Churches of Christ in Christian Union denomination. It later became Circleville Bible College. In 2006, the college changed its name to Ohio Christian University and received regional accreditation.

The university was granted an exception to Title IX in 2016 which allows it to legally discriminate against LGBT students for religious reasons.

Presidents

Campus
The university sits on the outskirts of Circleville, Ohio. Classes are located in the Maxwell Center, Johnson Hall, and the Robert W. Plaster Free Enterprise Center. Students reside as freshmen in York Hall and Moore Hall. From there, they may choose to live in New Hall for women and New 2 Hall for men, or a selection of on-campus townhouses.

Since 2008, Maxwell Center has expanded by adding the science and logistics center and a student development center.

Academics
The school offers the Bachelor of Arts, Associate of Arts, and Master of Arts in professional fields of study. It also offers an Adult and Online Degree Program.

Ohio Christian University's Adult and Online Degree Programs offer associate, bachelor's, and master's degrees. OCU offers online education and evening or weekend classes at campuses in Ohio including Dublin, Columbus, Pataskala, Grove City, Lancaster, Circleville, Chillicothe, Nelsonville and the campuses of Southern State Community College in Wilmington, Washington Court House, Hillsboro and Sardinia.

Accreditation
The university is accredited by the Higher Learning Commission. It is also accredited by the Association for Biblical Higher Education and recognized by the Churches of Christ in Christian Union, Primitive Methodist Church, Evangelical Church, and Evangelical Methodist Church for ministerial training.

Student life
The Student Involvement Council (SIC) offers activities throughout the school year. A popular activity is midnight breakfast, an event scheduled at the beginning of final examinations week, catered by favorite staff and faculty.

Chapel is housed in the Ministry & Performing Arts Center and is offered twice weekly (usually Tuesday and Thursday). Students come to worship with a live student band and hear a message by the chaplain or special guest. There is a required number of times that every student must attend while enrolled at Ohio Christian.

Hickman Student Center houses dining facilities, the office of Student Development, the department of psychology, and several classrooms. In addition, there is a full Christian bookstore, a coffee shop, and an arcade.

Athletics
The Ohio Christian athletic teams are called the Trailblazers. The university is a member of the National Association of Intercollegiate Athletics (NAIA), primarily competing in the River States Conference (RSC; formerly known as the Kentucky Intercollegiate Athletic Conference (KIAC) until after the 2015–16 school year) since the 2015–16 academic year. They are also a member of the National Christian College Athletic Association (NCCAA), primarily competing as an independent in the Midwest Region of the Division I level.

Ohio Christian competes in 19 intercollegiate varsity sports: Men's sports include baseball, basketball, cross country, golf, soccer, tennis and track & field (indoor and outdoor); while women's sports include basketball, cross country, golf, soccer, softball, tennis, track & field (indoor and outdoor) and volleyball; and co-ed sports include disc golf and eSports.

Notable alumni
 Bilegtuvshin Battogtokh, soccer player called up for the Mongolia national soccer team
 Jaron Crane, member of the Idaho House of Representatives
 John C. Maxwell, author and leadership coach
 Stan Toler, former general superintendent of the Church of the Nazarene

References

External links
 Official website
 Official athletics website

Private universities and colleges in Ohio
Christian universities and colleges affiliated with the Churches of Christ in Christian Union
Circleville, Ohio
Educational institutions established in 1948
Education in Pickaway County, Ohio
Buildings and structures in Pickaway County, Ohio
Evangelicalism in Ohio
1948 establishments in Ohio